Kevin Lewis (27 November 1947 – 27 September 2020) was an Australian cricketer. He played in three first-class matches for South Australia in 1981/82.

See also
 List of South Australian representative cricketers

References

External links
 

1947 births
2020 deaths
Australian cricketers
South Australia cricketers
Cricketers from Adelaide